Coinside is an electronic body music group from Hoyerswerda (Saxony) and a part of the German electro-industrial scene. The group consists of Sven Bussler (music, samples, shouts), Torsten Bessert (vocals, lyrics, live drum), Veit Beck (live: machines, vocals) and the dancer Ronny Marschner (electronic dance acts).

History 
Coinside was created in 1993 by Sven Bussler as a music project. In the beginning it was an instrumental project. A publication of this time is the demo tape "Schlosstanz" (castle dance). In 1995 Torsten Bessert meet Coinside and joined the group due to common musical interests and enriched Coinside by a voice. The first tracks are characterized by aggression and anger.

In 1996 and 1997 Coinside published two more tapes - "Der Primat" (The Primate) and "Gestern, Heute und [K]ein Morgen !?" (Yesterday, today and (no) tomorrow). In its music Coinside presents controversial subjects such as child sexual abuse, earth pollution, euthanasia or the social discussion about death.
In 1997 Veit Beck joined the group.

In 1998 Coinside was for the first time a part of the Wave-Gotik-Treffen line-up.

In 1999 Coinside published its first album -  "Negator", in 2000 "Einst' und Heut" (Once and today) followed - both album are quite different from normal publications due to their special cover design. In 2000 Coinside played again at the Wave-Gotik-Treffen. In 2001 Coinside took a sabbatical.

In 2002 the group published the album "Malleus Maleficarum" which shows Coinside's style between Electronic music and  bombing hymns. This album contains as well their first clubhit "Hexenhammer" which spread over Germany. In 2003 Coinside published with the help of the Catwalk Studio the Album "Elf" (Eleven).

In 2006 the album "Morgenstund" (Morning hour) was published.

Coinside's lasted album appeared in 2009: "Opus Convertere".

In 2015 Coinside published all the music as "Gesammelte Werke". "Gesammelte Werke" stands for Greatest Hits of all their work.

Discography 
 1995 "Conceptions 1995"
 1996 "Der Primat" (The Primate)
 1997 "Gestern, Heute und (K)ein Morgen !?" (Yesterday, today and (no) tomorrow)
 1997 "Live"
 1999 "Die Stille durchbrochen" (Broke the silence)
 1999 "Negator"
 1999 "Einst und Heut'" (Once and today)
 2000 "Coinside Live"
 2002 "Malleus Maleficarum"
 2003 "Elf" (Eleven)
 2006 "Morgenstund" (Morning hour)
 2009 "Opus Convertere"
 2015: Gesammelte Werke 1995 - 2005 Best Hits, Collection Box with 5 Coinside-Audio CDs, 1 Video-DVD wirth concert records, 1 fan bag, several post cards, text lyric book, and a CD of Prisoners of Society & Transform Collage

Compilations 
 1996 "Electronic Future - Vol. 1"
 1997 "Twilight Sounds - Die Hofkurier Compilation"
 1999 "Newcomerfestival I Grossräschen"
 2001 "Neue Welten"
 2001 "Sonic-Xperience"
 2004 "Refraktor XX"
 2004 "Les Requiems d'Orpheus Volume 1"
 2004 "deCODEr v.2.0"

Side Projects 
 Ophir
 Wappenbund
 Transform Collage
 Prisoners of Society

Samples

External links 
 Website of Coinside (German only)
 Fan Website of Coinside (German only)
Coinside at Indiepedia (German only)

Electro-industrial music groups
German electronic music groups
Electronic body music groups